Barbara Huddleston Abney-Hastings, 13th Countess of Loudoun (3 July 19191 November 2002), was a Scottish countess in her own right, and a member of the House of Lords. Lady Loudoun was the oldest daughter of Reginald Mowbray Chichester Huddleston and Edith Abney-Hastings, 12th Countess of Loudoun. Her father took her mother's last name. Her only brother, Ian Huddleston Abney-Hastings, styled Lord Mauchline (1918–1944), was killed in Italy in World War II, so as the eldest sister, Barbara succeeded to the earldom in 1960.

Lady Loudoun was a member of the House of Lords until 1999, when the right of hereditary peers to sit in the Lords was abolished. She sat as a cross-bencher, and was concerned with social justice. She lived in Ashby-de-la-Zouch, Leicestershire.

Ancestry
On her mother's side, she was descended from and heir-general of George Plantagenet, 1st Duke of Clarence. Her other notable ancestors include Mary Tudor, Queen of France; King James IV of Scotland; William Cecil, 1st Baron Burghley; and Alice Spencer, Countess of Derby.

Marriages and children
Lady Loudoun married three times. She married, firstly, Captain Walter Strickland Lord on 5 September 1939. They had one child:
 Michael Abney-Hastings, 14th Earl of Loudoun (1942–2012)
Her second marriage was on 21 November 1945 to Captain Gilbert Frederick Greenwood. They had two children:
 Lady Selina Mary Abney-Hastings (b. 1946)
 Hon. Frederick James Abney-Hastings (b. 1949)
Her third and final marriage was to Peter Griffiths on 15 September 1954. They had three children:
 Lady Margaret Maud Abney-Hastings (b. 1956)
 Lady Mary Joy Abney-Hastings (b. 1957)
 Lady Clare Louise Abney-Hastings (b. 1958)

On her death, she was succeeded by her oldest son.

References

1919 births
2002 deaths
Earls of Loudoun
Hereditary women peers
Scottish countesses
People from Ashby-de-la-Zouch
Place of birth missing
Place of death missing
20th-century British women politicians
20th-century Scottish politicians
20th-century Scottish women
Loudoun